Ambodiara is a rural commune in Madagascar. It belongs to the district of Nosy Varika, which is a part of the region Vatovavy. The population of the commune was 7,417 in 2018.

This commune has been created recently by dividing the commune of Befody.

References 

Populated places in Vatovavy